Pi-balled is a video game written by Jason Austin for the ZX Spectrum and published by Automata UK in 1984. Pi-balled is a Q*bert clone.

Gameplay
Pi-balled is a game in which the player has to change the colors of the cubes in the pyramid by leaping from block to block while avoiding descending enemies.

Reception
Noel Williams reviewed Pi-balled for Imagine magazine, and stated that "If you want another fast action, eyestraining, fingerbreaking activity, you'll enjoy this, but if it is your mind or imagination that needs the exercise, forget it."

Reviews
Crash! - Apr, 1984
Sinclair User - May, 1984

References

External links
Pi-balled at MobyGames
Text of additional reviews at Spectrum Computing

1984 video games
Action video games
Automata UK games
Video game clones
Video games developed in the United Kingdom
ZX Spectrum games
ZX Spectrum-only games